Katmeteuoga is a monotypic moth genus in the family Erebidae. Its single species, Katmeteugoa hampsonia, is found on Java. Both the genus and species were first described by van Eecke in 1920.

References

Cisthenina
Monotypic moth genera
Moths described in 1920
Moths of Indonesia